Roman Aramian (born October 2, 1983) is an Armenian boxer, fighting out of Germany.

Aramian's world ranking is 174 out of 751.

Novel Aramian is known as international of German masters in the middleweight.

External links 
 

German people of Armenian descent
Armenian male boxers
Living people
1983 births
German male boxers
Super-middleweight boxers